Deming Jarves (1790–1869) was a 19th-century American glass manufacturer in Massachusetts. He co-founded the New England Glass Company and founded the Boston & Sandwich Glass Company, renowned for its pressed glass, and the Mount Washington Glass Company.

Brief biography

Jarves was born in 1790 in Boston, Massachusetts to a "prosperous cabinetmaker." He worked for the New England Glass Company between 1818 and 1825. He conducted business from offices in Boston, and the company's factory was located in East Cambridge.

In 1825, Jarves began the Boston & Sandwich Glass Company with its factory in Sandwich, Massachusetts, specializing in blown glassware, mold-blown glass, and machine-pressed glass. He built the company into what one writer calls "the most important manufacturer of pressed glass in 19th-century America"; he stayed with it until 1858, and it continued until 1888.

Jarves founded the Mt. Washington Glass Works in South Boston under the management of Captain Luther Russell. His children included John (d.1863), James, and Deming Jarves.

Selected writing
 Deming Jarves. Reminiscences of glass-making, 2nd ed. Hurd and Houghton, 1865.

References

External links

 
 
 WorldCat. Deming Jarves
 https://www.flickr.com/photos/preservationmass/sets/72157619401744414/ Photos of former glassworkers' houses in the Jarvesville neighborhood, Sandwich, MA

Businesspeople from Boston
1790 births
1869 deaths
Glass makers
19th-century American businesspeople